Richard "Harry" Harris, is an Australian anaesthetist and cave diver who played a crucial role in the Tham Luang cave rescue. He and Craig Challen were jointly awarded 2019 Australian of the Year as a result of that rescue.

Education and career
After completing school at St Peter's College in Adelaide, South Australia, Harris completed a Bachelor of Medicine and Bachelor of Surgery at Flinders University in 1988. He subsequently completed anaesthetics training in the United Kingdom and New Zealand. 

Harris has worked on medical assistance teams in natural disasters in the Pacific region and taken part in Australian Aid missions to Vanuatu.  he works as an aeromedical consultant and anaesthetist for the South Australian Ambulance Service's medical retrieval service.

Cave diving
Harris is a cave diver with over 30 years of experience. In 2011, Harris was requested by the South Australian Police to participate in the recovery of the body of his close friend Agnes Milowka, who had died whilst exploring a cave near Tantanoola in the south east of South Australia.

In 2009 Harris was awarded the "Outstanding Achievement" award at the Australian technical diving conference Oztek, to mark his exceptional contributions to cave diving exploration, in 2017 he was awarded the "Australasian Technical Diver of the Year" at Oztek.

Tham Luang cave rescue

In June 2018 Harris was about to depart on a cave diving holiday to the Nullarbor Plain when he and dive partner Craig Challen were requested by the Thai government, on the advice of British cave diving experts attempting to rescue twelve Thai children and their soccer coach who were trapped in the Tham Luang Nang Non cave system, to provide assistance with the rescue efforts.

Harris' efforts throughout the rescue have been described as essential; he conducted a medical assessment of all of the trapped boys and it was on his advice that the authorities reversed their initial strategy of rescuing the strongest boys first, followed by the weakest. At the 18 July press conference, it was revealed that the team decided as a group that the boys who lived the farthest away should leave first, so they could ride their bikes home.

To allow the rescue to occur, Harris developed a plan to keep the boys anaesthetised with ketamine while spontaneously breathing through full face masks. This was to ensure they did not panic during the long extrication through underwater caves, which would have endangered both the rescue scuba divers and the boys. Harris and Challen were the last members of the rescue team out of the caves following the rescue.

On 24 July 2018 Harris, along with Challen, was awarded the Star of Courage (SC) and Medal of the Order of Australia (OAM) by the Governor-General of Australia. On 7 September 2018 the King of Thailand appointed Harris as a Knight Grand Cross (First Class) of the Most Admirable Order of the Direkgunabhorn.

On Australia Day 2019, Harris was announced as the joint 2019 Australian of the Year with Challen.

On 5 November 2019 Harris and Challen released the book Against All Odds chronicling their participation in the rescue of the boys from the Tham Luang Cave. In the book they corrected some of the inaccuracies in the media regarding the rescue. Harris stated that he did not pick the order that the boys would leave the cave, and that the boys decided that amongst themselves based on the distance each boy lived from the cave, as they thought they had to cycle back home. He also said the boys were fully unconscious as they were carried through the flooded cave, as he had given each boy two intramuscular injections in the thigh: ketamine to put them to sleep, and atropine to suppress saliva production to stop choking.

References

External links
 National Geographic, "Record Cave Dive Leaves Mystery", published 3 May 2011.
 Wet Mules homepage

Living people
Australian anaesthetists
Australian underwater divers
Australian cavers
Cave diving explorers
Place of birth missing (living people)
Recipients of the Medal of the Order of Australia
Recipients of the Star of Courage (Australia)
Australian of the Year Award winners
Year of birth missing (living people)
Richard Harris
Tham Luang cave rescue